The Eastern States Collegiate Hockey League (ESCHL) is a collegiate hockey conference at the American Collegiate Hockey Association (ACHA) Division I level. The league was created in 2017 and is made up of eight teams located in the Northeast and Mid-Atlantic regions of the United States.

As of 2022, the ESCHL consists of Liberty University, Stony Brook University, Drexel University, Syracuse University, University of Rhode Island, University of Delaware, New York University. and the University of Pittsburgh (Pitt). All schools, except for New York University, compete primarily at the National Collegiate Athletic Association (NCAA) Division I level.

Format
League teams play a 20-game league schedule consisting of 2 games against each of the other league teams. League playoffs are held in February with the top 4 teams qualifying for the playoffs. ESCHL Champions receive an automatic bid to the ACHA Men's Division I National Tournament.

History
Penn State University won the first two playoff championships over the University of Delaware in both 2008 and 2009. The regular season title was shared by Penn State, Delaware, and the University of Rhode Island in the 2008-2009 with each team finishing with 25 points in the standings. Navy and Drexel left the conference to join the Eastern Collegiate Hockey Association and Robert Morris University joined the conference beginning in the 2010–11 season. In September 2010, prior to the start of the 2010-11 season, Penn State left the conference in 2011 during the program's transition to NCAA Division I. Robert Morris left the league to join College Hockey Mid-America(CHMA) but was replaced by Rutgers in the 2012-13 season. Rutgers left for NECHL in 2018. Drexel joined the league from ECHA before the 2020-2021 season. Niagara & Pitt joined the conference from the NECHL and CHMA for the 2022-23 season.

Membership

Previous members
Navy - 2007–2010, now in ECHA 
Scranton - 2007–2008, now in ACHA Men's Division II, CSCHC
Penn State - 2007–2011, now NCAA Division I
Robert Morris - 2010–2012, now in CHMA
Rutgers - 2012–2018, now in NECHL
Liberty - now ACHA Division I Independent

Conference arenas

List of Championship Games

See also 
 American Collegiate Hockey Association 
 List of ice hockey leagues

References

External links
ESCHL Site

ACHA Division 1 conferences
2007 establishments in the United States